Vanilla somae is a species of Vanilla native to the forests of Taiwan, northern Vietnam and Laos. The scientific names Vanilla albida and Vanilla griffithii are sometimes misapplied to this species, but they are actually three different species.

References

somai
Orchids of China
Orchids of Taiwan
Flora of Southeast China
Endangered flora of Asia
Taxonomy articles created by Polbot
Taxobox binomials not recognized by IUCN